= Roger Essley =

American writer

Roger Essley is the artist, illustrator and author of Reunion, a children's book about a boy who travels into a photograph and reunites with his Grandpa. He has two artworks currently hanging at the Metropolitan Museum of Art. Essley is also dyslexic.
